Desmatochoerus is a large extinct genus of oreodont of the family Merycoidodontidae, endemic to North America. Fossils have been uncovered in several locations in the western U.S.

References

Oreodonts
Oligocene even-toed ungulates
Prehistoric even-toed ungulate genera